Christina Swindle (born October 6, 1984) is a freestyle swimmer from the United States. Swindle won a gold medal in the 400-metre freestyle relay and a silver medal in the 100-meter freestyle at the 2003 Pan American Games.

References

1984 births
Living people
American female freestyle swimmers
Auburn Tigers women's swimmers
Sportspeople from Miami
Swimmers at the 2003 Pan American Games
Pan American Games gold medalists for the United States
Pan American Games silver medalists for the United States
Pan American Games medalists in swimming
Medalists at the 2003 Pan American Games